23 Comae Berenices is a binary star system in the northern constellation of Coma Berenices, situated a few degrees away from the North Galactic Pole. It is visible to the naked eye as a faint, white-hued point of light with an apparent visual magnitude of 4.80. The system is located around 310 light years away from the Sun, based on parallax. It is moving closer to the Earth with a heliocentric radial velocity of −16 km/s.

The primary, designated component A, is a magnitude 4.96 star with a stellar classification of A0IV, matching an A-type subgiant that has exhausted the supply of hydrogen at its core and is in the process of evolving into a giant. Bychkov et al.

The primary is 210 million years old and is spinning with a projected rotational velocity of 40 km/s. It has 2.15 times the mass of the Sun and about three times the Sun's radius. The star is radiating 104 times the luminosity of the Sun from its photosphere at an effective temperature of 9,675 K.

References

A-type subgiants
Am stars
Binary stars
Coma Berenices
Durchmusterung objects
Comae Berenices, 23
109485
061394
4789